Trifurcula baldensis is a moth of the family Nepticulidae. It is known from Monte Baldo in Italy.

The larvae feed on Genista radiata.

External links
Fauna Europaea

Nepticulidae
Endemic fauna of Italy
Moths described in 2005
Moths of Europe